Badouzi is a railway station on the Taiwan Railways Administration (TRA) Shen'ao line located in Zhongzheng District, Keelung, Taiwan.

History
The station was opened on 28 December 2016 after a five-month renovation which cost NT$10.82 million.

Design

See also
 List of railway stations in Taiwan

References

2016 establishments in Taiwan
Railway stations in Keelung
Railway stations opened in 2016
Railway stations served by Taiwan Railways Administration